Center Creek is a stream in the U.S. state of Minnesota.

Center Creek was named from the fact it heads near the Central Chain of lakes.

See also
List of rivers of Minnesota

References

Rivers of Faribault County, Minnesota
Rivers of Martin County, Minnesota
Rivers of Minnesota